X Factor is a Romanian television music competition that aims to find a new music talent to become a star. The second season will begin airing in the fall of 2012 on Antena 1. The winner will receive a prize of €200,000.

The hosts are the same as in the first season: Răzvan Simion and Dani Oțil, who are also known for hosting a well known morning show on Antena 1. The X Factor producers decided to change the entire group of judges. The first mentor announced for the season was Dan Bittman On 16 June, Antena 1 announced the other two members of the jury: singer Delia Matache, and Cheloo, member of the hip-hop band Paraziții.

The registration started for the second season in May 2012. Antena 1 made changes on the list for the audition cities: Constanța was dropped, Sibiu and Craiova were added.

Judges

Delia Matache – singer, celebrity
Dan Bittman – singer
Cheloo – rapper

Selection precess

Auditions
The first auditions took place at Craiova, on 15 June, and hundreds of people entered the contest for the chance to win the big prize. They then took place in Sibiu, on 18 June in Timișoara on 21 June 2012, on 27 June in Iași and concluded on 1 July 2012 in Bucharest.

Bootcamp
Filming for bootcamp was held in Bucharest. 196 people who received 3 yes entered bootcamp. The groups Sens Unic, Nord X, Station 4, Red, 2B, HOT and 4 Mix were formed from eliminated contestants from the 16–24, Overs 25 and Groups categories in bootcamp. After the bootcamp period, there were 26 acts left.

The 26 acts who reached the Judges' Houses:
16-24s: Ráduly Botond, Vasi Bistrae, Tudor Toduț, Nadir Tamuz, Ioana Anuța, Iulia Manolache, Sânziana Nicolae, Alexandra Broinaș and Diana Cazan
Groups: Sens Unic, R Family, Nord X, Station 4, 2B, Red, Soul Music Art, HOT and 4 Mix 
Over 25s: Ioan Mann, Lidia Glavu, Csaba Engi, Corina Chirilă, Natalia Selegean, Tudor Turcu, Dragoș Udilă and Iulia Glăvan

Judges houses

The judges received news of their categories. Cheloo mentored the Over 25's in Valea Doftanei, assisted by Bitză, Matache took the Groups to Delta Dunării with Mitză and Bittman had the 16-24s in Bucharest with Edi Petroșel.

The eleven eliminated acts were:
16-24s: 	Vasi Bistrae, Sânziana Nicolae, Alexandra Broinaș, Diana Cazan
Groups: Soul Music Art, HOT, 4 Mix, Sens Unic
Over 25s: Lidia Glavu, Csaba Engi, Corina Chirilă

Finalists

The 15 finalists were confirmed as follows;

Key:
 – Winner
 – Runner-up
 – Third place

Results summary
Color key

Live shows
Owing to the addition of four wildcard contestants, two acts were eliminated from the series' first results show. The three acts with the fewest votes were announced as the bottom three and the act with the fewest public votes was then automatically eliminated. The remaining two acts then performed in the final showdown for the judges' votes.

Week 1 (11 November)
Theme: Live Band
Group performance(s): "Party Rock Anthem", "We Found Love", "Give Me Everything", "The Edge of Glory"
Musical Guest: Alesha Dixon ("The Boy Does Nothing", "Scandalous")

Judges' votes to eliminate
 Cheloo: Station 4 – backed his own act, Iulia Glăvan
 Matache: Iulia Glăvan – backed her own act, Station 4
 Bittman: Iulia Glăvan – thought they have many flaws and Iulia has a great voice, Station 4 should be given a chance because they are young and inexperienced

Week 2 (18 November)
Theme: Love and Hate
Group performance(s): "Sweet Child o' Mine", "Crazy Crazy Nights", "Highway to Hell", "We Will Rock You", "I Love Rock 'n' Roll"
Musical Guest: Loreen ("Euphoria", "My Heart Is Refusing Me")

Judges' votes to eliminate
 Cheloo: Station 4 – He complained that two of the band members have a lack of talent
 Matache: Tudor Toduț – backed her own act, Station 4
 Bittman: Station 4 – backed his own act, Tudor Toduț

Week 3 (25 November)
Theme: Dance Music
Group performance(s): "Rain Over Me", "Starships", "Only Girl (In the World)", "Moves like Jagger"
Musical Guest: Alexis Jordan ("Happiness", "Good Girl")

Judges' votes to eliminate
 Cheloo: Nadir Tamuz – gave no reason
 Matache: Nadir Tamuz – backed her own act, Red
 Bittman: Red – backed his own act, Nadir Tamuz

Week 4 (2 December)
Theme: Romanian music
Group performance(s): "Miorița", Medley songs Holograf
Musical Guests: Margareta Pâslaru ("Libertate"), Paraziții ("Arde", "Toate-s la fel"), Stela Enache ("Ani de liceu"), Class ("Adu-i doina", "Toată lumea")

Judges' votes to eliminate
 Cheloo: Nord X – backed his own act, Dragoș Udilă
 Matache: Dragș Udilă – backed her own act, Nord X
 Bittman: Nord X – stated that Dragoș Udilă had delivered better performance throughout the night

Week 5 (8 December)
Theme: Michael Jackson vs. Elvis Presley
Musical Guests: Bonnie Tyler ("It's a Heartache", "Total Eclipse of the Heart"), Craig Harrison ("Bad", "Smooth Criminal")

Judges' votes to eliminate
 Matache: Ioan Mann – backed Natalia Selegean "as a woman"
 Bittman: Natalia Selegean – stated that Ioan Mann was the only contestant who made him cry
 Cheloo: Ioan Mann – stated that Ioan Mann's path had to end here

Week 6 (16 December)
Theme: Free Choice / Mentor's Choice
Group performance(s): "Celebration", "We Are Family", "Boogie Wonderland", "I Will Survive"
Musical Guest: Johnny Logan ("Hold Me Now", "What's Another Year"), Delia Matache ("Someone like You")

Judges' votes to eliminate
 Cheloo: Red – backed his own act, Natalia Selegean
 Matache: Natalia Selegean – backed her own act, Red
 Bittman: Red – stated that Natalia Selegean was more impressive

Week 7 (23 December)
Theme: Audition Songs, Christmas songs, Duet songs
Group performance(s): "Merry Christmas Everyone"
Musical Guest: Paula Seling & Al Bano ("Figlio delle Ande", Medley-"Sharazan", "Ci sarà", "Felicità"), Lexter ("Freedom to Love", "Peace & Love"), Diana Cazan ("La Viflaim, colo-n jos")

Round 1

Round 2

Ratings

References

External links
 xfactor official page

2012 Romanian television seasons
Romania 02
X Factor (Romanian TV series)
Antena 1 (Romania) original programming